John McKenzie Jackson (born 29 September 1941) is a British middle-distance runner. He competed in the men's 3000 metres steeplechase at the 1968 Summer Olympics.

References

1941 births
Living people
Athletes (track and field) at the 1968 Summer Olympics
British male middle-distance runners
British male steeplechase runners
Olympic athletes of Great Britain
Place of birth missing (living people)
Universiade silver medalists for Great Britain
Universiade bronze medalists for Great Britain
Universiade medalists in athletics (track and field)
Medalists at the 1967 Summer Universiade